Pleckstrin homology domain-containing family A member 6 is a protein that in humans is encoded by the PLEKHA6 gene.

References

Further reading

External links